The cervical spinal nerve 5 (C5) is a spinal nerve of the cervical segment.

It originates from the spinal column from above the cervical vertebra 5 (C5). It contributes to the phrenic nerve, long thoracic nerve, and dorsal scapular nerve before joining cervical spinal nerve 6 to form the upper trunk, a trunk of the brachial plexus, which then forms the lateral cord, and finally the musculocutaneous nerve.

Additional Images

References

Spinal nerves